William O'Donnell (born 29 September 1997) is a New Zealand cricketer. He made his List A debut for Auckland in the 2018–19 Ford Trophy on 4 November 2018. He made his first-class debut for Auckland in the 2018–19 Plunket Shield season on 17 March 2019.

In June 2020, he was offered a contract by Auckland ahead of the 2020–21 domestic cricket season. On 15 December 2020, in the 2020–21 Ford Trophy, O'Donnell scored his first century in a List A match, with 106 runs. He made his Twenty20 debut on 24 December 2020, for Auckland in the 2020–21 Super Smash.

References

External links
 

1997 births
Living people
New Zealand cricketers
Auckland cricketers
Place of birth missing (living people)